Karl Gottlieb Mauch (7 May 1837 – 4 April 1875) was a German explorer and geographer of Africa. He reported on the archaeological ruins of Great Zimbabwe in 1871 during his search for the biblical land of Ophir.

Exploration and Great Zimbabwe

In 1871, Mauch arrived at the stone ruins now known as Great Zimbabwe, five years after discovering the first gold mines in the Transvaal. Mauch believed that the ruins were the remnants of the lost biblical city of Ophir, described as the origin of the gold given by the Queen of Sheba to King Solomon. He did not believe that the structures could have been built by a previous local population similar to those which inhabited the area at the time of his excavation, and so pressed ahead with his research. Further research on the site (including one of the first archaeological uses of aviation) illustrated that the structures did indeed have African origin. 

Because of the ethnocentrism popular in the 19th century, Mauch and his contemporaries have been intensely criticized for their assumptions about the site by modern archaeologists. The Great Zimbabwe site is now considered to have been built by ancestors of the Shona people between the 11th and 15th centuries CE.

Mauch died as a result of a fall from the third floor window of a hotel where he was living. It is uncertain whether the death was accidental or self-inflicted.

In media and popular culture
"The Real King Solomon's Mines" was the fifth episode in World Media Rights' Raiders of the Lost Past docudrama series, and focused on the life of Mauch and his quest to discover the fabled mines. The episode was first transmitted in the UK via the Yesterday channel on 23 November 2012, was directed by Gerry Pomeroy, narrated by Jonny Phillips and featured Ross Owen Williams as Karl Mauch. In the week of its first transmission, the Sunday Times Culture Magazine recommended the episode as a pick of the week.  In North America, the episode was included in the television history series Myth Hunters.

See also
 Eurocentrism
 Africa in Antiquity
 Zimbabwe

References

Bibliography
 Maquet, Jacques. (1972). Civilizations of Black Africa. New York. Oxford University Press.

External links

German explorers
Explorers of Africa
German geographers
19th-century German geologists
1837 births
1875 deaths
People from the Kingdom of Württemberg
Deaths from falls